Tungsten(VI) oxytetrachloride is the inorganic compound with the formula WOCl4.  This diamagnetic solid is used to prepare other complexes of tungsten.  The yellow-green compound is soluble in nonpolar solvents but it reacts with alcohols and water and forms adducts with Lewis bases.

Structure

The solid consists of weakly associated square pyramidal monomers.  The compound is classified as an oxyhalide.

Synthesis and reactions
WOCl4 is prepared from tungsten trioxide:
WO3  +  2 SOCl2   →   WOCl4  +  2 SO2
WCl6 + (Me3Si)2O →   WOCl4 + 2  Me3SiCl

WOCl4 is Lewis acidic.  It is a precursor to catalysts used for polymerization of alkynes.

References

Chlorides
Metal halides
Oxychlorides
Tungsten compounds